Atlantis Submarines is a Canadian passenger submarine company. The company currently has 12 submarines and operates undersea tours in Grand Cayman, Barbados, Aruba, Guam, St. Thomas, Cozumel and in Hawaii at Kona, Maui and Oahu.

In order for passengers to reach the submarine they board a shuttle ferry, then they enter the submarine via steep stairs. When the submarine goes down they see corals, sunken ships, treasures, and fish through large viewports. When the submarine ride is finished the passengers are returned by the ferry to shore where they are given dive certificates. Some 12 million passengers have taken the Atlantis submarine tour to date.

The Atlantis XIV, which sails from Waikiki Beach, Hawaii, accommodates 64 passengers and is the world's largest passenger submarine.

History

Atlantis was founded by current president and CEO Dennis Hurd, a former designer of submersibles for North Sea oil rigs, with US$3 million borrowed from friends and relatives. The company launched the world's first commercial passenger submarine tours in Grand Cayman in 1986. It has since serviced about 12 million passengers.

Areas of operation
There are three main areas of operations:

Caribbean (Aruba, Barbados, Cozumel, Curacao, Grand Cayman, St. Martin)

Hawaii (Waikiki, Maui, Kona)

Pacific (Guam)
The novelty of riding a submarine to explore the underwater world of Guam is facilitated by Atlantis Submarines Guam. Managed by Atlantis Guam Inc., the Atlantis V is a 65-foot air conditioned submarine that can carry up to 48 passengers. The tour takes off in a passenger boat in Apra Harbor and explores the marine life in the GabGab reef. The reef has corals that were formed over 1,800 years ago. Varieties of fish that can be seen are moorish idol, unicorn fish, spade fish, sea turtle, giant trevally, clownfish, surgeon fish, and occasionally sharks. Other highlights of the tour are diving to depths of 45 meters and curtain of air bubbles as the submarine ascends to the surface.

Variants
 Atlantis I, 1986
 Atlantis II, 1986
 Atlantis III, 1987
 Atlantis IV, V 1988
 Atlantis VI 1989
 Atlantis VII 1990
 Atlantis IX, X 1991
 Atlantis XI, 1991
 Atlantis XII, XIV 1994

References

External links
 
 Atlantis Submarines Guam

Submarines